Hot Octopuss is a London-based sex toy company. Founded in 2011 by Julia Margo and Adam Lewis, the first Hot Octopuss, Pulse (stylized as PULSE), also known as the Guybrator, was released in September 2013. The male apparatuses oscillate to stimulate men. The PULSE range is highly popular and has been featured in Playboy, The Wall Street Journal, GQ Magazine, Men's Health and Cosmopolitan. Hot Octopuss products are available globally in over 50 countries.

History
In 2008, while working in conference management, Lewis had an idea for a durable male sex toy. He discovered an article on Penile Vibratory Stimulation, which described a way to bring about ejaculation in men with spinal cord injuries, regardless of sensation below the waist. He went to Denmark to meet the scientists who had developed equipment to do this and obtained the patents to use the technology in his sex toy.

Lewis and partner Julia Margo created Pulse, which was described by Wired as a "Darth Vader-style vibro helmet for penises". It sold out in the first six months by word of mouth. In 2015, Pulse II, with a second motor was released. In 2016 the company released Pulse III.

In January 2016, after a Time Out survey revealed that 39% of male New Yorkers masturbated while at work, Hot Octopuss created a masturbation booth called GuyFi in New York City that invited men to self-stimulate their penises to ejaculation.

Hot Octopuss' was featured in "Pillow Talk" that had sex expert, Jenny Block (who blogs regularly for Huffington Post) riding around Manhattan on a four-poster bed. The event was featured on ABC's Nightline.

Products timeline
2013 PULSE v1 (now discontinued)

2015 PULSE II (now discontinued)

2015 PULSE II SOLO (now discontinued)

2016 PULSE DUO launched

2017 Pocket PULSE

2017 Pocket PULSE Remote (now discontinued)

2017 Queen Bee launched (now discontinued)

2018 ATOM launched

2018 ATOM PLUS launched

2019 JETT launched

2019 DiGiT launched

2019 PULSE SOLO ESSENTIAL launched 

2019 PULSE SOLO LUX launched

2019 AMO launched

2021 KURVE launched

2021 ATOM PLUS LUX launched

2021 PULSE SOLO INTERACTIVE in partnership with KIROO launched

Partners
Hot Octopuss products are sold directly via their online website and also are available via Lovehoney, Adam & Eve, Amazon and other global distributors.

Awards 
Some awards are:

2014. XBIZ Awards, for Couples Sex Toy Of The Year with the PULSE

2014. ETO Awards, for Best Male Product with the PULSE

2015. XBIZ Awards, for Male Sex Toy of the Yearwith the PULSE II

2018. XBIZ Awards, for Male Sex Toy/Line Of The Year

2021. XBIZ Europa Awards, for Luxury Pleasure Product of the Year with the KURVE

References

External links
Official Website
Vibrating Panties

Sex toy manufacturers
British companies established in 2011